Erythrodiplax is a large Neotropical genus of dragonflies in the family Libellulidae. These small to medium-sized skimmers are commonly known as dragonlets.

Species
The genus contains the following species:

Gallery

References

Libellulidae
Anisoptera genera
Odonata of North America
Odonata of South America
Insects of Central America
Insects of the Caribbean
Taxa named by Friedrich Moritz Brauer
Taxonomy articles created by Polbot